SCUSD may refer to:
 Sacramento City Unified School District
 Santa Clara Unified School District